Bigdeli is a surname. Notable people with the surname include:

Ali Bigdeli (born 1987), Iranian football player
Azar Bigdeli (1722–1781), Iranian anthologist and poet
Gholamhossein Bigdeli (1919–1998), Iranian writer
Ruhollah Bigdeli (born 1986, Iranian football player
Schahriar Bigdeli (born 1980), German long jumper
Yadollah Bigdeli (1883–1960), Iranian official